☨ may refer to:
Patriarchal cross
Cross of Lorraine